Dmitri Andreyevich Teterin (born 31 August 1979) is a former Russian football player.

External links
 

1979 births
People from Samara Oblast
Living people
Russian footballers
Association football midfielders
Russian Premier League players
FC Lada-Tolyatti players
PFC Krylia Sovetov Samara players
FC Elista players
FC Kuban Krasnodar players
FC Mordovia Saransk players
FC Lokomotiv Moscow players
FC Nosta Novotroitsk players
Sportspeople from Samara Oblast